The Rubi-Tele Hunting Reserve is found in Democratic Republic of the Congo. It was established in 1930. It has an area of 6191.43 km.

References

Protected areas of the Democratic Republic of the Congo
Northeastern Congolian lowland forests